Renton Municipal Airport  is a public use airport located in Renton, a city in King County, Washington, United States. The airport was renamed Clayton Scott Field in 2005 to celebrate the 100th birthday of Clayton Scott. The airport's northern boundary is Lake Washington and the Will Rogers–Wiley Post Memorial Seaplane Base. Renton Airport has a floating dock and a launching ramp for conversion from wheeled landings to water takeoffs and landings.

The airport is owned by the City of Renton and is a general aviation airport which serves Renton and other nearby communities. It provides regional aviation services for air charter, air taxi, corporate, business and recreational flyers. It is included in the Federal Aviation Administration (FAA) National Plan of Integrated Airport Systems for 2017–2021, in which it is categorized as a regional reliever facility.

The airport is located approximately 12 miles southeast of downtown Seattle near the south end of Lake Washington. US Customs service is available for both floatplane and wheeled aircraft arriving by water or by land.

Renton Airport is adjacent to the Boeing Renton Factory that manufactures 737s and formerly 757s, and is the initial point of departure for airplanes produced in that facility.

Facilities and aircraft 
The runway was resurfaced and realigned in August 2009; prior to this time, it was designated 15/33.

In 2016, the airport had 122,908 aircraft operations, an average of 337 per day: 98% general aviation, 1% air taxi, <1% scheduled commercial, and <1% military. In July 2017, there were 337 aircraft based at this airport: 243 single-engine, 13 multi-engine, 4 jet, and 8 helicopter.

Accidents and incidents 
 2022 Mutiny Bay plane crash: On September 4, 2022, a Friday Harbor Seaplanes DHC-3 Otter float airplane operated for Northwest Seaplanes on a flight from Friday Harbor Seaplane Base to Renton Municipal Airport crashed at Mutiny Bay Washington, according to the United States Coast Guard. One body was found; nine others are missing. On September 5, search for the missing was suspended.

References

External links 
 
 Boeing Employees Flying Association
 KRNT listing at FlightCentral.Net
 Aerial image as of July 1990 from USGS The National Map
 
 
 

Airports in King County, Washington
Airport
Airports with year of establishment missing